Eleazar Alexander Juárez Sarabia (born 11 March 1969 in Nacaome) is a Honduran doctor and former politician, he served as deputy of the National Congress of Honduras representing the Liberal Party of Honduras for Valle from 2006 to 2014 and Partido Libertad y Refundacion from 2014 to 2018.

References

1969 births
Living people
Deputies of the National Congress of Honduras
Liberal Party of Honduras politicians
People from Nacaome
Honduran physicians